Sasal is a hamlet located in the municipality of Sabiñánigo, in Huesca province, Aragon, Spain. As of 2020, it has a population of 8.

Geography 
Sasal is located 54km north of Huesca.

References

Populated places in the Province of Huesca